John Mapes Adams (October 11, 1871 – January 6, 1921) was an American Marine who received the Medal of Honor for valor  during the Boxer Rebellion. His birth name was George Lawrence Day, but he served in the Marine Corps under the alias of John Mapes Adams.

Biography

John Mapes Adams was born October 11, 1871, in Haverhill, Massachusetts. He attended Phillips Exeter Academy.

On July 13, 1900, while a sergeant in the United States Marine Corps he "distinguished himself by meritorious conduct" in battle at Tianjin, China (then Tientsin). His Medal of Honor was issued on July 19, the next year. He re-enlisted in Panama on October 11, 1902.

As of May 20, 1903 he had been promoted to the rank of gunnery sergeant and was hospitalized in Washington, D.C.

Adams was buried at the Cypress Hills National Cemetery in Brooklyn, New York.

Medal of Honor citation
Adams Medal of Honor citation:

Rank and organization: Sergeant, U.S. Marine Corps. Born: October 11, 1871, Haverhill, Mass. Accredited to: Massachusetts. G.O. No.: 55, July 19, 1901.

Citation:

In the presence of the enemy during the battle near Tientsin, China, 13 July 1900, Adams distinguished himself by meritorious conduct.

See also
List of Medal of Honor recipients
List of Medal of Honor recipients for the Boxer Rebellion
 U.S. Marine Corps Medal of Honor recipients for actions on same day and place
Harry C. Adriance
Alexander J. Foley

References

1871 births
1921 deaths
United States Marines
American military personnel of the Boxer Rebellion
United States Marine Corps Medal of Honor recipients
Boxer Rebellion recipients of the Medal of Honor
People from Haverhill, Massachusetts
Phillips Exeter Academy alumni
Burials at Cypress Hills National Cemetery